P. exigua may refer to:

 Partula exigua, an extinct snail
 Parvocaulis exigua, a green algae
 Parvulastra exigua, a sea star
 Patella exigua, a true limpet
 Pelegrina exigua, a jumping spider
 Peperomia exigua, a radiator plant
 Perigona exigua, a ground beetle
 Phaneroptera exigua, an Old World katydid
 Phasmoneura exigua, a carnivorous insect
 Philine exigua, a headshield slug
 Phoma exigua, a plant pathogen
 Phorocera exigua, a tachina fly
 Phycolepidozia exigua, a liverwort endemic to Dominica
 Phyllosticta exigua, a sac fungus
 Plagiolepis exigua, a formic-acid-producing ant
 Platythyrea exigua, a predaceous ant
 Plecopterodes exigua, an Afrotropical moth
 Pleurothallis exigua, a bonnet orchid
 Ponometia exigua, an American moth
 Prenanthella exigua, a flowering plant
 Prumnopitys exigua, a Bolivian conifer
 Pseudopoda exigua, a huntsman spider
 Psilogramma exigua, a hawk moth
 Purpurcapsula exigua, a false cowry
 Puya exigua, a plant endemic to Ecuador